Australia's Got Talent is an Australian reality television show, based on the original UK series, to find new talent. The fourth season premiered on the Seven Network on 13 April 2010 and ended on 15 June 2010. Radio DJ Kyle Sandilands and Irish singer Brian McFadden joined the judging panel as replacements for Tom Burlinson and Red Symons. Auditions took place throughout February 2010 and were held in the five major cities across Australia. The live shows began on 11 May 2010 and ended on 15 June 2010, where dance troupe Justice Crew were crowned the winners of the fourth season of Australia's Got Talent. They were awarded a prize of $250,000. Runner-up Cameron Henderson was awarded a runner-up prize of performing at the 2010 AFL Grand Final.

Judges

In January 2010, it was made known that the judging panel would undergo a new line-up to accommodate Minogue's pregnancy. Judge Red Symons was strongly tipped to return to the Nine Network to be part of the revived Hey Hey It's Saturday, while Tom Burlinson was rumoured to be dumped from the judging panel. Rumours then began to circulate that Kyle Sandilands and Brian McFadden would be the new judges. On 4 February 2010, Sandilands confirmed on his 2Day FM breakfast radio show that he would be a judge. A press release from the Seven Network on 17 February, confirmed McFadden would also join the new judging panel.

Auditions

Semi-finalists

Semi-final summary
 Buzzed out |  Judges' vote | 
 |  |

Semi-final 1

Semi-final 2

Semi-final 3

Semi-final 4

  Due to the majority vote for Cameron Henderson, Sandilands' voting intention was not revealed.

Final

Ratings

References 

Australia's Got Talent
2010 Australian television seasons